The  is a professional wrestling championship owned by the All Japan Pro Wrestling (AJPW) promotion. On August 28, 2012, AJPW and Gaora TV announced that AJPW would introduce a new championship called the Gaora TV Championship. A tournament for the title took place from September 8 to October 7, with Seiya Sanada becoming the inaugural champion. There have been a total of twenty-three reigns shared between nineteen different champions. The current titleholder is Minoru Tanaka who is in his first reign.

Championship tournament

Title history

Combined reigns

See also

References

External links
 Official website of AJPW
 Official title history at Gaora.co.jp

All Japan Pro Wrestling championships
Television wrestling championships